Ahuan may refer to:
 Ahuan-e Bala
 Ahuan-e Vasat